Compete America is a coalition representing corporations, universities, research institutions and trade associations that advocate for reform of United States immigration policy for highly educated foreign-born professionals.

Compete America supports the idea that scientists, researchers, and engineers will continue to be in demand and drive economic growth and job creation.  Because of this, they argue that arbitrarily low visa quotas and massive backlogs in the system plague the employment- based visa process.

Compete America's legislative goals are:
 The end of arbitrary obstacles to employment and permanent residency for foreign-born master’s and Ph.D. graduates from U.S. universities
 A streamlined green card process
 A market-based H-1B visa cap

Principles 
Compete America supports the following principles:

 The United States must grow domestic sources of talent, and our member organizations are committed to improving U.S. science, technology, engineering and mathematics (STEM) education and encouraging more young Americans to choose careers in those fields.
 U.S. employers must be able to recruit and retain foreign-born highly educated professionals – particularly after they graduate from a U.S. university – as an important complement to domestic sources of talent. 
 The U.S. employment-based visa system must be permanently fixed so that foreign-born talent can stay in the United States, innovating for America.
 Brainpower is even more essential in a down economy, and future growth and job creation will be led by innovation, whether it’s new technologies, new cures or new sources of energy.  America does not have a monopoly on brainpower, and in an increasingly competitive global environment, we have to retain the talent that will keep us leading worldwide innovation.
 Strong, smart enforcement is needed, to protect American and foreign-national workers, and laws should punish bad actors and recognize that most employers who hire foreign professionals follow the rules scrupulously.
 Immigration reform must safeguard the interests of American workers, while recognizing that excessive and protectionist measures that shut off access to foreign-national talent will only inhibit innovation, job growth and the resulting opportunities for American workers.

List of members 
 Accenture 
 Altria 
 American Council of Engineering Companies
 American Council on International Personnel
 American Immigration Lawyers Association
 Analog Devices  
 Association of American Universities
 Association of Public and Land-grant Universities
 The Boeing Company
 Business Roundtable
 Business Software Alliance
 Cisco Systems Inc.
 The Coca-Cola Company
 CompTIA 
 Entertainment Software Association
 Genentech 
 Global Personnel Alliance
 Google, Inc. 
 Hewlett-Packard Company
 Information Technology Industry Council
 Intel Corporation 
 International Rectifier
 Microsoft Corporation
 Motorola Inc. 
 NAFSA: Association of International Educators
 National Association of Manufacturers
 National Semiconductor
 Oracle Corporation
 QUALCOMM Inc. 
 Semiconductor Equipment & Materials International (SEMI)
 Semiconductor Industry Association 
 Society for Human Resource Management
 Software & Information Industry Association
 TechAmerica
 Telecommunications Industry Association 
 Texas Instruments 
 U.S. Chamber of Commerce

References

External links
 Compete America Homepage - competeamerica.org
 Select Op-Eds page
 "A Smart Exception," David Gergen, Parade, June 13, 2010

Technology trade associations